Galerie Buchholz is an art gallery specializing in international contemporary art with exhibition spaces in Cologne, Berlin and New York City. The gallery was founded in Cologne in 1986 by Daniel Buchholz, and today is run jointly with Christopher Müller.

History 

The gallery's exhibition spaces are located in Cologne at Neven-DuMont-Strasse 17, in Berlin at Fasanenstrasse 30, and in New York at 17 East 82nd Street. Since its founding the gallery has had various locations in Cologne. Its first location was at Bismark Strasse 50, in a former storage facility of the Cologne gallerist Rudolf Zwirner. In 1988, the gallery opened at Venloer Strasse 21. In 1990, Buchholz and gallerist Esther Schipper opened Buchholz & Schipper, a shop specializing in multiples, at Albertusstrasse 26. In 1992, Buchholz & Buchholz opened on Breite Strasse 36, an exhibition space in the second antique bookshop of Daniel Buchholz's father. 

Since 1994, Galerie Daniel Buchholz has been located at Neven-DuMont-Strasse 17, in the primary location of the antiquarian bookstore that his father founded. Daniel Buchholz converted the former storage spaces of the bookstore into exhibition spaces, and, since his father's death in 1993, has continued to run Antiquariat Buchholz parallel to the gallery. This address remains the headquarters for the gallery today. The art historian Christopher Müller began organizing film programs and co-curating exhibitions in the gallery in 1996. Since 2000 he has been a partner in the gallery. In 2006 the gallery opened a second exhibition space in Cologne on the nearby Elisenstrasse. 

In 2008, Galerie Buchholz established a location at Fasanenstrasse 30 in the Charlottenburg neighborhood of Berlin. In 2015, it opened an exhibition space in New York City, at 17 East 82nd Street on the Upper East Side, Manhattan.

Exhibitions 
In 1985, Daniel Buchholz organized exhibitions with artists John Armleder and Brian Eno in the former storage facility of Rudolf Zwirner in Cologne. Following this, he founded a space called Daniel Buchholz, where he mounted exhibitions of John M. Armleder, Olivier Mosset, Udo Lefin, Allan Belcher and Uwe Lausen, Ken Lum, Dieter Roth and the Canadian artist collective General Idea. In 1987 Buchholz organized an exhibition on the history of multiples and exhibitions of the complete graphic works of Blinky Palermo and Sigmar Polke.
In the same year, Buchholz presented his first collaboration with the artist Isa Genzken.  Buchholz organized her exhibition project Musix, in which he showed Genzken's concrete "World Receiver" radio sculptures in the window of a HiFi electronics store in Cologne. In the following of 1988, Genzken had her first solo exhibition with Daniel Buchholz, and has been primarily represented by the gallery ever since. In 1990, Daniel Buchholz presented the exhibition project "Samson" by Chris Burden. In 1993 he opened a new gallery under the name Buchholz & Buchholz. It was here that he presented his first exhibition by the artist Wolfgang Tillmans, whom the gallery continues to represent today.

Alongside the exhibitions by represented artists, Galerie Buchholz regularly presents curated and historical exhibitions. For example, the 2013 and 2015 exhibitions on the life and work of French writer Raymond Roussel; or the 2014 symposium and exhibition on the occasion of the 70th birthday of the American theorist and curator Douglas Crimp, organized together with Diedrich Diederichsen, Juliane Rebentisch and Marc Siegel. In 2017, Christopher Müller and Diedrich Diederichsen organized the exhibition "Cosmic Communities: Coming Out Into Outer Space - Homofuturism, Applied Psychedelia & Magic Connectivity" in the gallery's New York office.
The gallery participates in the fairs Art Basel, Art Basel Miami Beach, Art Cologne, and Frieze Art Fair London.

Artists 
Galerie Buchholz represents numerous living artists, including:
 Simon Denny
 Isa Genzken
 Jutta Koether
 Michael Krebber
 Wolfgang Tillmans
 Danh Vo

In addition, the gallery has managed various artist estates, including: 
 Lutz Bacher
 Tony Conrad
 Thomas Eggerer
 Martin Wong

References

External links 
 Official website 

Art museums and galleries in Berlin
Art museums and galleries in Germany